Rolling Thunder Cyclocross Race is a premier bicycle racing event held in Missoula, MT every October. The race is characterized by nighttime racing, competitive fields, and challenging courses. Past winners have included regional strongmen Clint "The Lung" Muhlfeld, Sam Krieg, and Subaru-Trek rider Sam Schultz.

Rolling Thunder Axe
The Rolling Thunder Axe is a traveling trophy that is awarded to the highest placing rider from Montana in the Elite Men's race. The axe is adorned with the name of each winner, and comes with a free entry to the next edition of the race.

Past winners

References 

Cyclo-cross races
Sports in Montana